SEEMORE SAT CHANNEL is a Croatian pay per view satellite platform owned by OIV company. Introduced in 2005, it was the first project of this kind in Croatia. It has 25.000 users and broadcasts 45 channels. SEEMORE is operating in Croatia, Slovenia, Serbia, Montenegro, Bosnia and Herzegovina and North Macedonia.
 HBO
 N1
 Al Jazeera Balkans
 CNN International
 CCTV News
 NHK World TV
 RT
 SABC News International
 i24news
 Sky News
 National Geographic Channel
 Nat Geo Wild
 Nat Geo Music
 CBS Reality
 CMC
 CBS Europa
 BabyTV
 Jim Jam
 MTV Adria
 C Music TV
 Hustler TV
 Eurosport
 Euronews
 CNBC Europe
 Disney Channel
 Cartoon Network
 Boomerang
 Turner Classic Movies
 Nick Jr.
 Nickelodeon
 Disney Junior
 Disney Cinemagic
 AMC
 Sundance Channel
 ShortsTV
 Fox Life
 Fox Crime
 24Kitchen
 Travel Channel EMEA
 Motors TV
 FUEL TV
 Fashion One
 E!
 Comedy Central Extra
 France 24

Sources
 http://www.croatiabiz.com/info_lnews-article.php?ID=21805 

Television networks in Croatia
Satellite television